Salim Ismail (born May 17, 1965 in Hyderabad, India) is an Indo-Canadian serial entrepreneur, angel investor, author, speaker, and technology strategist. He is the Founding Executive Director of Singularity University and lead author of Exponential Organizations. In March 2017 he was named to the board of the XPRIZE Foundation.

He is a serial entrepreneur having co-founded a number of tech companies (Confabb, PubSub Concepts and Ångströ, acquired by Google in 2010) and led Brickhouse, Yahoo!'s internal incubator for new products.

He is the lead author of international bestseller Exponential Organizations, and the founder of ExO Works and OpenExO, where he serves as Chairman.

Early life
Ismail was born in Hyderabad, India, spent early childhood in Mumbai, and at 10, moved to Toronto, Ontario, Canada. He traveled extensively as part of the school's co-op program, working with companies such as IBM UK, Control Data and Northern Telecom.

Career
After graduating from university, Ismail worked as a software architect for CSC Europe and later as a business consultant at ITIM Associates in London. In 1999, he became the COO of New York Business Forums in New York City.

Startup Ventures 
In 2001, Ismail founded the New York Grant Company [NYGC] in direct response to 9/11, where he served as its Chairman/CEO until 2005. In its first year, NYGC attracted over 400 clients and delivered over $12 million of federal grants to the local economy.

In 2002, Ismail co-founded PubSub Concepts, which laid some of the foundation for the real-time web. The company had an ugly ending that was discussed at various PR crisis management conferences.

In 2006, he co-founded Confabb.com with four others to create a centralized place to get information about conferences. The company received $200k in angel funding from early investors including Dave Winer.

Yahoo 
In early 2007, Yahoo appointed Ismail as Vice President and Head of Brickhouse, Yahoo's internal incubator. The objective of Brickhouse was to form teams to work on disruptive ideas. During his tenure with Yahoo!, Ismail worked on several products and launched new products for them including WildFire, Yahoo Pipes and Fire Eagle as well as created a relationship between Yahoo! and NASA to explore various collaborative projects.

Ångströ 
Ismail was one of the executives that left Yahoo! in the wake of the failed Microsoft bid in 2008 and with his friend, Rohit Khare he cofounded Ångströ, a company that used social networks to find news about their clients, colleagues and friends. The service notified users in real time and attracted the attention of Google, which ended up acquiring it in 2010.

Singularity University 
In September, 2008, NASA invited Ismail to the founding conference of Singularity University, held at NASA's Ames Research Center. In October of that year, Ismail was appointed as its founding Executive Director.

Singularity University's goal is to “educate, inspire and empower a new generation of leaders to apply exponential technologies to address humanity’s grand challenges.” Singularity University – whose founders hail from Google and the XPRIZE Foundation – has brought together people from more than 85 countries to apply disruptive technologies – biotechnology, artificial intelligence, and neuroscience – to more than 100 startups. For two years, Ismail worked with Peter Diamandis and Ray Kurzweil, along with key partners NASA, Google, Cisco, Autodesk and Genentech to build out the university, assembling its core team and faculty, establishing the curriculum and leading the first programs. In late 2010, Ismail took on the role of Singularity University's Global Ambassador.

ExO Works 
Ismail founded ExO Works in 2016 to lead innovation practices and introduce organizations to "exponential thinking." The ExO Movement now includes a platform and consulting teams, educational programs, books and tools to build exponential organizations.

OpenExO 
In 2017, Ismail co-founded ExO Lever, later renamed OpenExO, where he acts as Chairman. The company's mission is to help organizations, institutions and people transform for the future by implementing and evolving the exponential thinking and practices. It hosts the world's leading ExO transformation ecosystem, with more than 5,000 experts.

Rokk3r Fuel ExO 
Rokk3r Fuel was launched as a venture capital firm in March 2017 with the goal of investing in exponential technologies at a global level, working with founders through a tested co-building strategy. On September 20, 2017, Salim Ismail joined the firm as a General Partner. With the addition to Mr. Ismail as General Partner, Rokk3r Fuel also announced that it is naming its flagship fund Rokk3r Fuel ExO, which has $150 million to fund startups using the ExO Methodology. The ExO Methodology uses specific parameters to score an entity based on its use of assets like community, big data, algorithms, and new technology into achieving performance benchmarks ten times better than its peers.

Public speaking
Ismail speaks at conferences and industry events on the topics of disruptive convergence, exponential organizations, future of entrepreneurship, future of democracy and future of education, such as TED conferences, the Noco Foundation and Ciudad de las Ideas in 2012.

In 2012, he participated in the debate at the Oxford Union as part of Saïd Business School's Silicon Valley Comes to Oxford 12 programme.

 he holds the position of Global Ambassador for Singularity University, representing it at various conferences and industry events.

Book 
In 2011, Ismail started writing Exponential Organizations with co-authors Mike Malone and Yuri van Geest. The book was released by Diversion Books, a division of Diversion Publishing Corp., on October 14, 2014 and reached No. 1 on Amazon's “Best-Sellers in Business Management,” and was named Frost & Sullivan's “Growth, Innovation and Leadership Book of the Year.” It has been translated into more than 15 languages.

The book aims to provide readings with information on “why new organizations are ten times better, faster and cheaper than yours (and what to do about it)” and comes down to a simple philosophy: in business, performance is key and when it comes to performance how you organize your efforts is the key to growth.

Awards and honors

From 2012 to 2014, Ismail was a judge for The Economist Magazine's Annual Innovation Awards.

In March 2017, he was elected to the board of XPRIZE.

Philanthropy 
After 9/11, Ismail founded New York Grant Company [NYGC], an organization formed to help deliver grants to affected businesses in Lower Manhattan. NYGC helped deliver over 25% ($12 million) of all grants given out in the area.[10]

In 2016, he created the Fastrack Institute, a non profit organization that accelerates technology into society by finding holistic approaches to solving problems, with a focus on large urban centres. It is also a conceptual framework for the design of future governance approaches and regulatory frameworks for industries, cities and regions seeking solutions to critical problems.

References

External links
 Official website

1965 births
Living people
Canadian company founders
Canadian investors